Vazisubani is a village in Gurjaani Municipality, Kakheti region, Georgia. It is located 14 km north-west of Gurjaani, at an altitude of about 500 m. The population was 2,862 inhabitants in 2014.

Vazisubani is known for the appellation wine of the same name. Vazisubani has many religious monuments of interest, including the 10th century Sanagiri Church and Monastery.

See also
 Kakheti

References 

Populated places in Gurjaani Municipality